The 2015–16 Toto Cup Leumit was the 26th season of the second tier League Cup (as a separate competition) since its introduction. It was held in two stages. First, sixteen Liga Leumit teams were divided into four regionalized groups, from which the winners and runners-up advanced to the quarter-finals. Quarter-finals, semi-finals and the final were then played as one-legged matches.

The defending cup holders were Hapoel Bnei Lod, having won the cup on its previous edition.

In the final, played on 15 December 2015, Hapoel Ashkelon defeated F.C. Ashdod 1–0.

Group stage
Groups were allocated according to geographic distribution of the clubs. The groups were announced by the IFA on took place on 25 June 2015.

The matches are due to be played from 1 August.

Tiebreakers
If two or more teams are equal on points on completion of the group matches, the following criteria are applied to determine the rankings.
 Superior goal difference
 Higher number of victories achieved
 Higher number of goals scored
 Higher number of points obtained in the group matches played among the teams in question
 Superior goal difference from the group matches played among the teams in question
 Higher number of victories achieved in the group matches played among the teams in question
 Higher number of goals scored in the group matches played among the teams in question
 A deciding match, if needed to set which team qualifies to the quarter-finals.

Group A

Group B

Group C

Group D

Knockout rounds

Quarter-finals

Semifinals

Final

See also
 2015–16 Toto Cup Al
 2015–16 Liga Leumit
 2015–16 Israel State Cup

References

External links
 Official website 

Leumit
Toto Cup Leumit
Toto Cup Leumit